The Embassy of the State of Palestine in Iraq is the diplomatic mission of the Palestine in Iraq. It is located in Baghdad.

See also

List of diplomatic missions in Iraq.
List of diplomatic missions of Palestine.

References

Iraq
Palestine
Iraq–State of Palestine relations